Tropomyosin receptor kinase B (TrkB), also known as tyrosine receptor kinase B, or BDNF/NT-3 growth factors receptor or neurotrophic tyrosine kinase, receptor, type 2 is a protein that in humans is encoded by the NTRK2 gene.  TrkB is a receptor for brain-derived neurotrophic factor (BDNF).  Standard pronunciation is "track bee".

Function 
Tropomyosin receptor kinase B is the high affinity catalytic receptor for several "neurotrophins", which are small protein growth factors that induce the survival and differentiation of distinct cell populations.  The neurotrophins that activate TrkB are: BDNF (Brain Derived Neurotrophic Factor), neurotrophin-4 (NT-4), and neurotrophin-3 (NT-3).> As such, TrkB mediates the multiple effects of these neurotrophic factors, which includes neuronal differentiation and survival. Research has shown that activation of the TrkB receptor can lead to down regulation of the KCC2 chloride transporter in cells of the CNS. In addition to the role of the pathway in neuronal development, BDNF signaling is also necessary for proper astrocyte morphogenesis and maturation, via the astrocytic TrkB.T1 isoform.

The TrkB receptor is part of the large family of receptor tyrosine kinases. A "tyrosine kinase" is an enzyme which is capable of adding a phosphate group to certain tyrosines on target proteins, or "substrates". A receptor tyrosine kinase is a "tyrosine kinase" which is located at the cellular membrane, and is activated by binding of a ligand to the receptor's extracellular domain. Other examples of tyrosine kinase receptors include the insulin receptor, the IGF1 receptor, the MuSK protein receptor, the Vascular Endothelial Growth Factor (or VEGF) receptor, etc.

Currently, there are three TrkB isoforms in the mammalian CNS. The full-length isoform (TK+) is a typical tyrosine kinase receptor, and transduces the BDNF signal via Ras-ERK, PI3K, and PLCγ. In contrast, two truncated isoforms (TK-: T1 and T2) possess the same extracellular domain, transmembrane domain, and first 12 intracellular amino acid sequences as TK+. However, the C-terminal sequences are the isoform-specific (11 and 9 amino acids, respectively). T1 has the original signaling cascade that is involved in the regulation of cell morphology and calcium influx.

Family members 
TrkB is part of a sub-family of protein kinases which includes also TrkA and TrkC.  There are other neurotrophic factors structurally related to BDNF: NGF (for Nerve Growth Factor), NT-3 (for Neurotrophin-3) and NT-4 (for Neurotrophin-4). While TrkB mediates the effects of BDNF, NT-4 and NT-3, TrkA  is bound and thereby activated only by NGF. Further, TrkC binds and is activated by NT-3.

TrkB binds BDNF and NT-4 more strongly than it binds NT-3.  TrkC binds NT-3 more strongly than TrkB does.

LNGFR 
There is one other BDNF receptor besides TrkB, called the "LNGFR" (for "low-affinity nerve growth factor receptor"). Unlike TrkB, the LNGFR plays a somewhat less clear role in BDNF biology. Some researchers have shown the LNGFR binds and serves as a "sink" for neurotrophins. Cells which express both the LNGFR and the Trk receptors might therefore have a greater activity – since they have a higher "microconcentration" of the neurotrophin. It has also been shown, however, that the LNGFR may signal a cell to die via apoptosis – so therefore cells expressing the LNGFR in the absence of Trk receptors may die rather than live in the presence of a neurotrophin. The LNGFR is not required for BDNF to activate TrkB.

Role in cancer 
Although originally identified as an oncogenic fusion in 1982, only recently has there been a renewed interest in the Trk family as it relates to its role in human cancers because of the identification of NTRK1 (TrkA), NTRK2 (TrkB) and NTRK3 (TrkC) gene fusions and other oncogenic alterations in a number of tumor types. A number of Trk inhibitors are (in 2015) in clinical trials and have shown early promise in shrinking human tumors.

Role in Neurodegeneration 
TrkB and its ligand BDNF have been associated to both normal brain function and in the pathology and progression of Alzheimer’s disease (AD) and other neurodegenerative disorders. First of all, BDNF/TrkB signalling has been implicated in long-term memory formation, the regulation of long-term potentiation, as well as hippocampal synaptic plasticity.  In particular, neuronal activity has been shown to lead to an increase in TrkB mRNA transcription, as well as changes in TrkB protein trafficking, including receptor endocytosis or translocation. Both TrkB and BDNF are downregulated in the brain of early AD patients with mild cognitive impairments, while work in mice has shown that reducing TrkB levels in the brain of AD mouse models leads to a significant increase in memory deficits. In addition, combining the induction of adult hippocampal neurogenesis and increasing BDNF levels lead to an improved cognition, mimicking exercise benefits in AD mouse models. The effect of TrkB/BDNF signalling on AD pathology has been shown to be in part mediated by an increase in δ-secretase levels, via an upregulation of the JAK2/STAT3 pathway and C/EBPβ downstream of TrkB. Additionally, TrkB has been shown to reduce amyloid-β production by APP binding and phosphorylation, while TrkB cleavage by δ-secretase blocks normal TrkB activity. Dysregulation of the TrkB/BDNF pathway has been implicated in other neurological and neurodegenerative conditions, including stroke, Huntington’s Disease, Parkinson’s Disease, Amyotrophic lateral schlerosis and stress-related disorders.(Notaras and van den Buuse, 2020; Pradhan et al., 2019; Tejeda and Díaz-Guerra, 2017).

As a drug target 
Entrectinib (formerly RXDX-101) is an investigational drug developed by Ignyta, Inc., which has potential antitumor activity. It is a selective pan-trk receptor tyrosine kinase inhibitor (TKI) targeting gene fusions in trkA, trkB (this gene), and trkC (respectively, coded by NTRK1, NTRK2, and NTRK3 genes) that is currently in phase 2 clinical testing. In addition, TrkB/BDNF signalling has been the target for developing novel drugs for Alzheimer’s Disease, Parkinson’s Disease or other neurodegenerative and psychiatric disorders, aiming at either pharmacological modulation of the pathway (e.g. small molecule mimetics) or other means (e.g. exercise induced changes in TrkB signalling).

Ligands

Agonists

 3,7-Dihydroxyflavone
 3,7,8,2'-Tetrahydroxyflavone
 7,3′-Dihydroxyflavone
 7,8,2'-Trihydroxyflavone
 7,8,3'-Trihydroxyflavone
 Amitriptyline
 BNN-20
 Brain-derived neurotrophic factor (BDNF)
 Deoxygedunin
 Deprenyl
 Diosmetin
 DMAQ-B1
 Eutropoflavin (4'-DMA-7,8-DHF)
 HIOC
 LM22A-4
 N-Acetylserotonin (NAS)
 Neurotrophin-3 (NT-3)
 Neurotrophin-4 (NT-4)
 Norwogonin (5,7,8-THF)
 R7 (prodrug of tropoflavin)
 R13 (prodrug of tropoflavin)
 TDP6
 Tropoflavin (7,8-DHF)

Antagonists

 ANA-12
 Cyclotraxin B
 Gossypetin (3,5,7,8,3',4'-HHF)

Others
 Dehydroepiandrosterone (DHEA)
 Fluoxetine
 Imipramine
 Ketamine
 (2R,6R)-hydroxynorketamine

Interactions 
TrkB has been shown to interact with:

 Brain-derived neurotrophic factor (BDNF),
 FYN,
 NCK2,
 PLCG1,
 Sequestosome 1, and
 SHC3.

See also 
 Trk receptor

References

Further reading

External links 
 Memories are made of this molecule - New Scientist, 15 January 2007.

Tyrosine kinase receptors
Developmental neuroscience